Todd Woodbridge and Mark Woodforde won the title, defeating Alex O'Brien and Sandon Stolle 6–2, 6–4 in the final.

Seeds

  Todd Woodbridge /  Mark Woodforde (champions)
  Alex O'Brien /  Sandon Stolle (final)
  Sergio Casal /  Emilio Sánchez (first round)
  Jakob Hlasek /  Brett Steven (semifinals)

Draw

Draw

External links
Draw

Doubles